City Beneath the Sea may refer to:

 "City Beneath the Sea" (song), a song by Harry Connick, Jr.
 City Beneath the Sea (1953 film), a 1953 American adventure film 
 City Beneath the Sea (1971 film), a 1971 American science fiction television film 
 City Beneath the Sea (TV series), a British television series 

See also:
 The City Under the Sea, a.k.a. War-Gods of the Deep, 1965 film with Vincent Price